The Lodger may refer to:
 The Lodger (novel), a 1913 horror novel about a Jack the Ripper-like serial killer by Marie Adelaide Belloc Lowndes
 The Lodger: A Story of the London Fog, a 1927 British silent film by Alfred Hitchcock
 "The Lodger", a radio adaptation episode of Suspense
 The Lodger (1932 film), a British thriller film
 The Lodger (1944 film), an American horror film
 The Lodger (opera), a 1960 opera by Phyllis Tate
 The Lodger (2009 film), an American mystery/thriller film
 The Lodger (band), an indie pop band from Leeds, England
 "The Lodger" (Doctor Who), an episode of Doctor Who

See also
 Lodger (disambiguation)
 The Lodgers (disambiguation)